Bradley Mark (born 26 February 1957) is a New Zealand born Australian shooter who has represented Australia in two Paralympic Games.

Personal
Mark was born on 26 February 1957 in New Zealand. He is from Wynnum, Queensland. He has incomplete quadriplegia as a result of bacterial meningitis when he was thirty-five years old. He was a 2011 Queensland Sporting Wheelies Senior Male Athlete of the Year nominee. He has a dog from  Assistant Dogs Australia who helps him complete tasks which allow for greater independence.

Shooting

Mark is an SH2 classified shooter specialising in 10m standing air rifle and 10m prone air rifle events.

Mark started competitive shooting in 2005. He first represented Australia in 2009. At the 2011 World Cup in Turkey, he won a gold medal.  He repeated his gold medal performance at the 2011 World Cup in Sydney. He was selected to represent Australia at the 2012 Summer Paralympics in shooting. The 2012 Games were his first. He did not medal.

At the 2014 IPC World Championships, he finished 24th in the 10m Air Rifle Standing SH2  and 16th in the 10m Air Rifle Prone SH2. In 2015, his best results were at the IPC World Cup in Sydney where he was 2nd in the 10m Air Rifle Prone SH2 and 3rd in the 10m Air Rifle Prone SH2. Mark's results qualified him to  compete at the 2016 Rio Paralympics. He did not medal, placing 9th in the prone event and 12th in the standing event.

He is a Queensland Academy of Sport scholarship holder.

References

External links
 
 

Paralympic shooters of Australia
Living people
1957 births
Shooters at the 2012 Summer Paralympics
Shooters at the 2016 Summer Paralympics
People from Redland City